The Indonesian football league system is a series of league system for association football clubs in Indonesia. Since 1994, Liga Indonesia is the league competition featuring association football clubs, as a result of two existing top-flight football leagues merger: Perserikatan (amateur) and Galatama (semi professional). Liga Indonesia is managed by PSSI, the Indonesian national football federation.

There are three levels of competition in the hierarchy recently. The top two in the hierarchy are professional competitions, whereas the rest are amateur.

Structure 
Liga 1 is the first-tier of football league in Indonesia. Until 2017, it was known as Indonesian Super League. The second-tier is Liga 2, formerly Premier Division. Liga 1 and 2 are professional leagues and governed by PT. Liga Indonesia Baru.

The only amateur league is Liga 3. Liga 3 consists of an unlimited number of amateur teams. Every province, in total 34 provinces in Indonesia, holds its own provincial league and the number of teams per province may vary. The winners of the provincial leagues will advance to the national play-off round or national round.

Men's

History
From 1914 to 1930, Indonesia featured an amateur national football league organized by the Nederlandsch Indische Voetbal Bond (NIVB), called the Dutch East Indies city championship (DEI Championship).

Beginning in 1931, the Perserikatan was founded as a separate amateur national football league system consisting of several levels of competition. It was the first Indonesian football league competition organized by PSSI. From 1932 to 1950, the DEI Championship competition ran in conjunction with the Perserikatan as a competition for the Dutch and other European players, while the Tiong Hoa Championship was held for players of Chinese descent.

In 1979/80, a semi-professional league was founded, namely Galatama (The Premier League), which consisted of only one level of competition (except 1983 and 1990 in which it involved 2 divisions). Therefore, since 1979, both Galatama and Perserikatan were existed and had their own league systems.

In 1994, PSSI merged both competitions into a new competition system, namely the Liga Indonesia. All clubs from both top level leagues were merged into the Liga Indonesia Premier Division, the new system's top-flight league. Furthermore, since Galatama did not have lower-level leagues, Liga Indonesia's lower leagues took all clubs from the same level in Perserikatan.

In 2008, PSSI created a new level, the Indonesia Super League (ISL), as the system's new top-flight league. Hence, the Premier Division was then relegated to the second and so on. This new league was created to introduce full professionalism in Indonesian football.

In parallel with this league, U-21 teams from each participating ISL clubs compete in the ISL U-21.

In 2011, PSSI replaced the ISL with the Indonesian Premier League (IPL).

After the extraordinary congress on 17 March 2013, Premier League and Super League are in PSSI supervision prior to incorporation in 2014 under the name of Indonesia Super League. Before that the two leagues were still running, respectively.

In 2014, PSSI divided into four level leagues competition include Super League, Premier Division, First Division and Amateur League/Province League called Liga Nusantara.

Started in 2015 league planned just divided into three level leagues competition include Super League, Premier Division and Liga Nusantara, after first division merged with Liga Nusantara.

In 20 January 2017, PSSI announced to replace three previous league (Super League, Premier Division and Liga Nusantara) with three new leagues, namely the Liga 1, Liga 2 and Liga 3.

On 4 March 2023, PSSI announced name changes for Liga 1 and Liga 2, namely Liga Indonesia and Liga Nusantara. On 19 March 2023, PSSI announced to offer one of the 11 programs, namely Liga 3 Provinsi.

Competition format
From the 1994–1995 to 2004–2005 season, Liga Indonesia's structure changed almost every year. For some seasons, there were two divisions within the top flight; for others, there were three. The number of clubs in the top flight wavered from 18–28, and seasons would last from 34–38 games. The top four clubs in each division qualified for a group stage "Final Eight Championship Playoff." Winners of the group faced off for the championship.

During the 2004–2005 season, 18 clubs comprised the Indonesian top flight. A season lasted 34 games, in which each club played against each other on a home-and-away basis. The three teams at the bottom of the table are relegated into Division Satu, the second level of the Indonesian league system, while the three teams of Division Satu that won promotion replace them. The top two finishers in the league qualify for the AFC Champions League.

Starting with the 2003–2004 season, the championship was decided a double round-robin league system involving the top clubs of each division. Beginning with the 2005–2006 season, 28 clubs will comprise Liga Indonesia. Clubs compete in two divisions of 14 clubs each. Each club plays against each other on a home-and-away basis.

The league's popularity has grown so much that the 2006–2007 season will see another big expansion of the league from 28 to 36 clubs with both divisions comprising 18 clubs each.

In 2008, 18 top ranked clubs in the previous Premier Division were 'promoted' to a new highest level of competition, the Indonesia Super League, and the rest stayed in the same division. The PSSI examined those 18 clubs for their readiness to join the ISL, considering many aspects, like the stadium, financial condition and other requirements for full professional football clubs.

Promotion and relegation
Liga 1 (level 1, 18 teams): the bottom three teams are relegated.
Liga 2 (level 2, 28 teams): the champions, runner-up and third-place teams are promoted to Liga 1. The bottom three teams of each region are relegated to Liga 3.
Liga 3 (level 3, unlimited number team): Six-best teams are promoted to Liga 2.

Cup eligibility
Being members of a league at a particular level also affects eligibility for Cup, or single-elimination, competitions.
Piala Indonesia: 128 teams from level 1, level 2 and level 3 enter in the first round.

Cup competitions
Annual cup tournaments
Piala Indonesia 
Piala Liga for Galatama Clubs (defunct) 
Piala Galatama for Galatama Clubs (defunct)

Break season tournaments 
Indonesia President's Cup
Piala Menpora  (defunct)
Piala Presiden Soeharto (defunct)
Piala Utama (defunct)
Indonesian Community Shield (defunct)
Inter Island Cup (defunct)
Galatama-Perserikatan Invitational Championship (defunct)

All tier champions by season

1994–2004

2005–2008

2008–2011

2011-2013 / Dualism Era

2014

2015-2016

2017–present

See also
 Football records in Indonesia
List of football clubs in Indonesia by major honours won
 Indonesian Women Football Tournament
 Indonesia Pro Futsal League

Footnotes

External links
  of PSSI
 Liga Indonesia News

Football league systems in Asia